Sheikh Rahman (born November 15, 1960) is a Bangladeshi-American politician who has served in the Georgia State Senate from the 5th district since January 14, 2019. He is the first Muslim lawmaker in Georgia.

Personal life 
Sheikh Rahman was born in Bangladesh. He moved to Lawrenceville, Georgia and attended Central Piedmont Community College in 1981. He graduated from the University of Georgia in 1995 with a Bachelor of Business Administration. He has a wife, Sham'e (née Afrose), and two kids, Rawda (daughter) and Anzar (son).

See also 
2018 Georgia State Senate election

References

External links 
 Profile at the Georgia State Senate
 Campaign website

1960 births
American people of Bangladeshi descent
Asian-American people in Georgia (U.S. state) politics
Living people
American Muslims
People from Lawrenceville, Georgia
Democratic Party Georgia (U.S. state) state senators
University of Georgia alumni
21st-century American politicians